Hamlagrøvatnet is a lake on the border of the municipalities of Voss and Kvam in Vestland county, Norway. The  lake is the largest lake in all of Hordaland county.

The lake is a reservoir on the river Bergsdalselvi which has four hydroelectric power stations on it. The lake is surrounded by many holiday cottages.

See also
List of lakes in Norway

References

Lakes of Vestland
Kvam
Voss
Reservoirs in Norway